Lower Breck Football Club is a football club based in Anfield, Liverpool, England. The team was founded in 2010.

References

External links

Football Club History Database – Lower Breck

Football clubs in England
Football clubs in Merseyside
North West Counties Football League clubs
Liverpool County Premier League
Association football clubs established in 2010
2010 establishments in England